Polynucleobacter aenigmaticus is an aerobic, facultatively anaerobic, chemo-organotrophic, non-motile, free-living bacterium of the genus Polynucleobacter.

The type strain was isolated from a small alkaline lake located in Austria. This strain differers from other Polynucleobacter type strains due to its origin from a deep anoxic water layer. The genome sequence of the strain was fully determined., The type strain dwells as a free-living, planktonic bacterium in the water column of the lake, thus is part of freshwater bacterioplankton.

References 

Burkholderiaceae
Bacteria described in 2017